Susan Gaertner is a Minnesota politician and the former county attorney for Ramsey County, Minnesota. She was a candidate for the Democratic-Farmer-Labor Party endorsement for governor in the 2010 election, and is currently a principal at Minneapolis-based law firm Gray Plant Mooty.

Family and early life
Gaertner grew up on the Eastside of St. Paul during a period of opportunity for working-class families. Her mother and father took full advantage of this environment, with her mother attending college at a time it was uncommon for women to pursue higher education, and her father served as a social worker in Ramsey County. Gaertner currently lives in White Bear Lake, Minnesota, with her husband, John Wodele, the former press secretary for Governor Jesse Ventura. She has three daughters.

Education and professional career

Gaertner attended Harding High School in Saint Paul, Minnesota. She went on to graduate from the University of Minnesota Duluth and the University of Minnesota Law School. After graduation, Gaertner served as a clerk in the office of Federal Appeals Court Judge Gerald W. Heaney, and later worked as a criminal defense attorney for the William Mauzy Law Firm. Gaertner then joined the Ramsey County's attorney office in 1984.

In 1989, while working for the Ramsey County Attorney's office, she became the first Minnesota prosecutor to introduce DNA evidence in court. Later, as Ramsey County Attorney, Gaertner established programs designed to curb domestic violence.

Awards and honors
In 2002 Gaertner was inducted into the Harding High School Hall of Fame in recognition of her successful Truancy Intervention Program.  In 2004, the Minnesota County Attorneys Association awarded her the group's highest honor—an honor presented annually to a county attorney who exhibits extraordinary leadership in the field of justice.  An accomplished trial attorney who has continued trying cases after being elected county attorney, Gaertner was inducted in the elite American College of Trial Lawyers in 2009.

2010 gubernatorial run

In 2009, Gaertner announced her candidacy for governor as a Democrat, citing her experience as a prosecutor in Ramsey County. Gaertner initially indicated she would not seek party endorsement, but would instead run in the DFL primary in August 2010. Due to pressure from the local community that criticized her over-zealous prosecution and labeling of eight protesters as "domestic terrorists" during the RNC 2008 convention, Gaertner announced that she would withdraw from the race.

Koua Fong Lee trial and aftermath
In the summer of 2010, prisoner Koua Fong Lee was released from prison after a retrial was ordered in manslaughter convictions in the crash involving his Toyota vehicle which killed three people. Susan Gaertner, who had consistently opposed his release (even after over 100 people had died in crashes related defective Toyotas), offered to release Lee from prison on the condition that he admit to guilt and register as a convicted felon, this during final deliberations of the appeals court deciding on his right to retrial. Immediately upon the court overturning his conviction and ordering a retrial, Gaertner announced she would not be pursuing another case against him; raising questions in the legal community and in the press about her judicial judgement for inexplicably flipping positions ex post facto.

Two months later, Gaertner announced she would not be seeking re-election.

References

External links
 The Ramsey County Attorney's Office website

Minnesota Democrats
Politicians from Saint Paul, Minnesota
People from Ramsey County, Minnesota
University of Minnesota Law School alumni
University of Minnesota Duluth alumni
Year of birth missing (living people)
Living people
Women in Minnesota politics
American women lawyers
American lawyers
Minnesota lawyers
21st-century American women